Adam-12 (also known as The New Adam-12) is a syndicated revival of the 1968–1975 series of the same name. Like the original, this program focused on the daily jobs and lives of two police officers whose patrol car is designated "Adam-12". This time, the officers assigned to Adam-12 were Matt Doyle (Ethan Wayne) and his partner Gus Grant (Peter Parros). This series ran two 26-episode seasons consecutively for 52 straight weeks, so although it had two seasons it ran for one calendar year. The New Adam-12 was paired up with another revival of a Jack Webb television series: The New Dragnet.  Both revivals were considerably different from the originals.  Original Adam-12 leads Martin Milner and Kent McCord each made separate appearances as their Adam-12 characters in episodes of the first season.

Cast and characters
 Ethan Wayne as Officer Matt Doyle
 Peter Parros as Officer Gus Grant
 Miguel Fernandes as Sgt. Harry Santos
 Linden Ashby as Officer Honeycutt
 Alma Martinez as Sgt. Elizabeth Cruz
 Harri James as Officer Neville

Episodes

Season 1 (1990–91)

Season 2 (1991)

References

External links
 

1990 American television series debuts
1991 American television series endings
1990s American police procedural television series
Fictional portrayals of the Los Angeles Police Department
First-run syndicated television programs in the United States
English-language television shows
Adam-12
Television series reboots
Television series by Universal Television